

Track listing
 "Hurting Inside"
 "Green Bay Killing"
 "Suffering as The Poor Man Cry"
 "Truth and Rights"
 "Progress"
 "Pope Paul Feel It"
 "African Do Deh"
 "Red Dress Lady"
 "The Fullness Thereof"
 "Stepping Out a Babylon"

Personnel
 Vocals : Big Youth
 Backing Vocals : Barry Llewellyn, Earl Morgan, Marcia Griffiths, Garnett Mirriam, Rita Marley
 Drums : Carlton "Santa" Davis
 Bass : George "Fully" Fullwood
 Rhythm Guitar : Tony Chin
 Lead Guitar : Earl "Chinna" Smith
 Keyboards : Keith McLeod
 Tenor Saxophone : Glen Da Costa
 Trombone : Vin Gordon
 Trumpet : David Madden, Arnold Breckenridge
 Alto Saxophone : Headley Bennett
 Percussions : Skully, Keith Sterling
 Harmonica : Jimmy Becker

Recording Information
 Recording : Harry J Studio (Kingston, JA)
 Engineer : Sylvan Morris
 Mixing Engineer : Big Youth & Sylvan Morris
 Arranger : Big Youth

References

1975 albums
Big Youth albums